Shuangmiaosaurus is a genus of herbivorous ornithischian dinosaur which lived during the late Albian age of the Early Cretaceous Period, about 100 million years ago. It was an iguanodont euornithopod which lived in China.

The type species, Shuangmiaosaurus gilmorei, was named and described by You Hailu, Ji Qiang Li Jinglu and Li Yinxian in 2003. The generic name refers to the village of Shuangmiao in Beipiao in Liaoning Province, the site of the discovery. The specific name honours the American paleontologist Charles Whitney Gilmore.

The holotype, specimen LPM 0165, was found in the Sunjiawan Formation, originally seen as dating to the Late Cretaceous (Cenomanian to Turonian) but today considered to have been somewhat older. It consists of a partial left upper jaw and lower jaw, including the maxilla, part of the praemaxilla, elements of the lacrimal and the dentary.

Shuangmiaosaurus was a rather large euornithopod. In 2010 Gregory S. Paul estimated its length at 7.5 metres, its weight at 2.5 tonnes.

Shuangmiaosaurus was originally considered a basal member of the Hadrosauroidea, one closely related to the Hadrosauridae. Subsequent authors, including David B. Norman of Cambridge University, consider it a more basal member of the Iguanodontia outside of the Hadrosauroidea.

References

Iguanodonts
Early Cretaceous dinosaurs of Asia
Fossil taxa described in 2003
Paleontology in Liaoning
Ornithischian genera